Qingyuan is a prefecture-level city of Guangdong province, People's Republic of  China (PRC).

Qingyuan may refer to these other locations in the PRC:

Mount Qingyuan, national park near Quanzhou, Fujian

Districts
Qingyuan District, Baoding, Baoding, Hebei
Qingyuan District, Ji'an, Ji'an, Jiangxi

Counties
Qingyuan County, Guangdong, the former name of the present Qingyuan Prefecture
Qingyuan County, Zhejiang
Qingyuan Manchu Autonomous County

Subdistricts
Written as "":
Qingyuan Subdistrict, Shijiazhuang, in Chang'an District, Shijiazhuang, Hebei
Qingyuan, Changsha, in Tianxin District, Changsha, Hunan
Written as "":
Qingyuan Subdistrict, Beijing, in Daxing District
Qingyuan Subdistrict, Quanzhou, in Fengze District, Quanzhou, Fujian

Towns
Qingyuan, Hebei, in Qingyuan County
Qingyuan, Heilongjiang, in Baoqing County
Qingyuan, Liaoning, seat of Qingyuan County
Qingyuan, Guangxi, in Yizhou
Written as "":
Qingyuan, Dingxi, in Weiyuan County, Gansu
Qingyuan, Wuwei, Gansu, in Liangzhou District
Qingyuan, Shanxi, in Qingxu County